Inuyasha the Movie: Fire on the Mystic Island is a 2004 Japanese animated fantasy adventure film based on Inuyasha manga series written and illustrated by Rumiko Takahashi. The film is directed by Toshiya Shinohara, written by Katsuyuki Sumisawa, and produced by Sunrise. The film was released in Japan on December 23, 2004.

In the film, Inuyasha and his friends protects a group of half-demon children from four evil demons on an ancient mystical island.

The film marks the fourth and final film for the Inuyasha series, following Swords of an Honorable Ruler (2003). After the film's release, the anime adaptation from the manga concluded with the final season for the anime series, Inuyasha: The Final Act.

Plot 

A group of half-demon children on Hōrai Island watch as a Kikyō look-alike comes to life in a green orb at the Cauldron of Resonance. Four scars, the mark of the Four War Gods Ryūra, Jūra, Kyōra, and Gōra, appear on all of the children's backs except for the youngest one, Ai. Asagi, the oldest, tells Ai to leave the island, and she is rescued by half-demon Inuyasha, schoolgirl Kagome Higurashi, monk Miroku, demon slayer Sango, fox demon Shippo, and Sango's nekomata companion Kirara. After Ai asks for Inuyasha to save the others, Inuyasha explains to his friends the myth of Hōrai Island, a place that appears once every fifty years. He remembers when he and Kikyō arrived on the island fifty years ago, they were ambushed by the Four War Gods, with Gōra extracting Kikyō's blood (used to make her doppelganger) and Ryūra marking Inuyasha's back with the four scars.

Following the island's reappearance, Kikyō learns of it and embarks to investigate, while Sesshomaru breaks off from his group - Jaken and Rin - to face Kyōra, who gave him the four scars in the past. As Inuyasha and company approach at the island, Jūra appears and fires his Thunder Cannon at them. Miroku and Sango fly away on Kirara to deter the attack, while Inuyasha, Kagome and Ai escape to the island shore where they meet Ryūra. When Ryūra nearly kills Inuyasha, Kagome interferes the battle, allowing Ryūra to escape.

Ai brings the group to a village where they meet the children and learn that Asagi will sacrifice herself to the Cauldron of Resonance, arguing that her death will allow the others to live a little longer. They all follow Asagi to the Cauldron, which Inuyasha and Asagi are pulled into after he attempts to destroy it. On the outside, the rest of the gang and the children try to open the doors while Inuyasha meets Lady Kanade, a priestess who fought the War Gods 50 years ago. She explains how she attempted to destroy them by taking their power spheres with her into the Cauldron at the cost of her life, only for the Gods to resort to sacrificing half-demons to the Cauldron so they could slowly regain their power. She gives Inuyasha a box containing the four power spheres and her remaining strength in exchange for her destroying the Cauldron and saving the children.

Inuyasha and Asagi free themselves and destroy the Cauldron, the damage of which breaks Kagome's bow and arrow set. Inuyasha is then attacked by the Kikyō look-alike after it exits the orb, stealing the power spheres and releasing them to the Four War Gods. The group then splits up; Inuyasha faces off against Kikyō's doppelgänger, Miroku and Sango fly on Kirara to battle Jūra and Gōra, and Kagome, Shippo, and the children attempt to make a raft for everyone to escape the island, only to be confronted by Ryūra. Meanwhile, Sesshomaru defeats Kyōra, leaving the others to deal with the remaining War Gods. Inuyasha is saved by the real Kikyō after she destroys her doppelgänger, and she leaves behind her bow and arrow.

Inuyasha returns to the shore to kill Ryūra. After Miroku, Sango and Kirara destroy Jūra, they help Inuyasha defeat Gōra. However, back on shore, the power spheres combine to form a new War God, with the only way to defeat it being a combination of Kagome's sacred arrow and Inuyasha's Backlash Wave attack. After one of the children, Shion, is guided to find Kikyō's arrow by the island's fireflies containing the spirits of those who were sacrificed, Kagome and Inuyasha use their powers to destroy the final War God once and for all, removing the four scars from those who were marked with them. They all escape the island's destruction on the raft, putting its myth to rest. The children, after residing temporarily at Kaede's village, bid farewell to Inuyasha and his friends to pursue their freedom.

Voice cast

Production
Staff members from the previous films returned for their respective positions: Toshiya Shinohara directed the film at Sunrise, with Katsuyuki Sumisawa wrote the screenplay, and Kaoru Wada composed the music respectively. Yoshihito Hishinuma, who designed the characters for the television series, took the role as a character designer and chief animation director for the film.

The theme song, "Rakuen" is performed by Do As Infinity.

Release
The film was released in Japanese theaters on December 23, 2004.

Notes

References

External links 
 Movie official site (in Japanese)
 
 

2004 anime films
Demons in film
Films based on works by Rumiko Takahashi
Films set in feudal Japan
Films set on uninhabited islands
Fire on the Mystic Island
Japanese animated fantasy films
2000s Japanese-language films
Viz Media anime
Films scored by Kaoru Wada
Films set on fictional islands

ja:犬夜叉 (映画)#犬夜叉 紅蓮の蓬莱島